Northern Railway Stadium is a multi purpose stadium in Bikaner, Rajasthan. The ground is mainly used for organizing matches of football, cricket and other sports.  The stadium has hosted five first-class matches  in 1976 when Rajasthan cricket team played against Vidarbha cricket team. The ground hosted four more first-class matches from 1978 to 1995. The stadium also hosted two List A matches when Willis XI played against Madhya Pradesh cricket team and against Central Zone cricket team played against West Zone cricket team but since then the stadium has hosted non-first-class matches.

References

External links 

 cricketarchive
 cricinfo
 North Western Railway

Sports venues in Rajasthan
Buildings and structures in Bikaner
Cricket grounds in Rajasthan
Defunct cricket grounds in India
Sports venues completed in 1976
1976 establishments in Rajasthan
Football venues in Rajasthan
20th-century architecture in India